Lacassine High School is a K-12 school in Lacassine, unincorporated Jeff Davis Parish, Louisiana. It is a part of Jeff Davis Parish Public Schools.

The first school in Lacassine opened in 1907.

Athletics
Lacassine High athletics competes in the LHSAA.

References

External links
 Lacassine High School

Schools in Jefferson Davis Parish, Louisiana
Public K-12 schools in Louisiana